Rheinau may refer to:

Rheinau, Switzerland, a town in the canton of Zürich
Rheinau Abbey, in Rheinau, Switzerland
Rheinau (Baden), a town in Baden-Württemberg, Germany
a part of Mannheim, Germany